The 1985–86 season was Heart of Midlothian F.C.s 3rd consecutive season of play in the Scottish Premier Division. Hearts also competed in the Scottish Cup, Scottish League Cup and the East of Scotland Shield.

Fixtures

Friendlies

League Cup

Scottish Cup

East of Scotland Shield

Scottish Premier Division

Scottish Premier Division table

Squad information

|}

See also
List of Heart of Midlothian F.C. seasons

References 

 Statistical Record 85-86

External links 
 Official Club website

Heart of Midlothian F.C. seasons
Heart of Midlothian